Count Karl Franz von Lodron (18 November 1748 – 10 August 1828) was the last prince-bishop of Brixen.

1748 births
1828 deaths
Counts of Austria
Bishops of Brixen